Braille Without Borders (BWB) is an international organisation for the blind in developing countries. It was founded in Lhasa, Tibet, by Sabriye Tenberken and Paul Kronenberg in 1998.

Overview 

BWB's mission is to give hope and practical skills to the blind and in particular to teach braille to the blind in developing countries; if no braille script exists for a particular language in a developing country, BWB must first develop it.

Formerly known as the Project for the Blind, Tibet, in September 2002 the project adopted the name Braille Without Borders.

Schools and centres

Tibet T.A.R 
School for the blind: The first centre, a school for blind Tibetan children, was established in Lhasa in 1997.
Massage centre: A clinical massage centre run and operated by the blind in Lhasa.
 Vocational Training Farm: A second centre, a farm and cheese factory, for the vocational training of adults has been established at Pelshong 270 km west of Lhasa near Shigatse.
In August 2017 it was made public that Chinese authorities will shut down the school for the blind as well as the vocational training farm without giving reasons.

India 
 IISE: The International Institute for Social Entrepreneurs (IISE) began in January 2009. This school runs an eleven months long course to train both sighted and non-sighted people to establish and  run their own social projects. The IISE is located at Kalliyoor on the Vellayani lakeside about 12 km from Trivandrum, the capital of Kerala, India.
 In 2011 IISE changed its name to "kanthari". A kanthari is a plant that grows wild in every backyard of Kerala, a small but very spicy chili with a number of medicinal values. A kanthari is also a symbol for those who have the guts to challenge harmful traditions and the status quo, who have fire in their belly and a lot of innovative ideas to make a positive difference. A kanthari will become the symbol of a new type of leader, a leader from the margins of society. The kanthari leadership course lasts seven months and always starts in May.

Achievements and events 
In 2004, Paul and Sabriye and a team of their blind students from Lhasa embarked upon the Climbing Blind expedition in Tibet under the leadership of blind Everest mountaineer Erik Weihenmayer. The prize-winning documentary Blindsight about this expedition was released worldwide to cinemas in 2006.

References

Literature 
 Tenberken S. (2003) My Path Leads To Tibet, Arcade Publishing.  
 Tenberken S. (late 2006 or early 2007) The Seventh Year - From Tibet to India

Media 
 2000 Documentary film titled Mit anderen Augen about Braille Without Borders. (This won Sabriye the 2000 Charity Bambi Award)
 2005-08-15 Sabriye and Paul were guests on a talk show for CCTV 9 in Beijing, China
 2005-10-17 Sabriye was a guest on The Oprah Winfrey Show titled 8 Women Oprah Wants You to Know, segment Phenomenal Females: Sabriye Tenberken's Journey
 2006 release of the documentary film Blindsight about the climbing project in the Himalayas with Erik Weihenmayer and students from the School for the Blind in Lhasa.

External links 
 
 Braille Without Borders International School for Development and Project planning (ISDeP)
 https://web.archive.org/web/20171201233112/http://www.blindsightthemovie.com/

Braille organizations
Schools for the blind
International organizations based in Tibet
Disability organizations based in Tibet
Organizations established in 1998
1998 establishments in China